Tracheops is a genus of moths in the family Geometridae.

Species
Tracheops bolteri

References

Geometridae